Natapohn Tameeruks (born 6 February 1989), nicknamed Taew, is a Thai actress, working for TV3.

Early life 

Natapohn Tameeruks, nicknamed Taew, was born on February 6, 1989, to Narong Temirak, a Chief Marshal, and Ruangthong Temirak. She is of mixed Thai and Mon ancestry; her father is an ethnic Mon. She rose to prominence after her appearance with other two Chinese performers, Yi Jianlian and Liu Yifei, in a television advertisement for Yili Group, a Chinese dairy producer. She graduated with a Bachelor's degree in architecture from Chulalongkorn University.

Personal life 
Natapohn was in a long-term relationship for 14 years, with Aach Lhaisakul (Ton), whom she first met in high school. Later, both of them ended the relationship, staying as friends only. 
She then got into a relationship with Pranai Phornprapha, a businessman .

Filmography

Films

Television dramas

Discography

Music videos

Song / OST

Concerts
 LOVE IS IN THE AIR : Channel 3 Charity Concert (2017)
 BABB BIRD BIRD SHOW #11-2018 : DREAM JOURNEY (Special Guest) (2018)
 The Return Of BBB #11 (Restage) (Special Guest) (2019)
 Kru Koy and The Gang Presents... Let's be Heroes Concert (2019)
 CH3Plus The Moment: GULF The Next Stage Livestream Concert (2021)

MC
 Online 
 20 : On Air YouTube:taewaew_natapohn

Awards and nominations

2019 KAZZ AWARDS
Best Couple with Jirayu Tangsrisuk (Nominated)

2020 Thai Crazy Awards
Best Couple Award with Jirayu Tangarisuk (Won)

References

External links

Living people
1989 births
Natapohn Tameeruks
Natapohn Tameeruks
Natapohn Tameeruks
Natapohn Tameeruks
Natapohn Tameeruks
Natapohn Tameeruks
Natapohn Tameeruks
Natapohn Tameeruks
Natapohn Tameeruks
Natapohn Tameeruks
Natapohn Tameeruks
Natapohn Tameeruks
Natapohn Tameeruks
Natapohn Tameeruks